Aloe capitata is a species of flowering plant in the Asphodelaceae family. It is native to Madagascar.

References

capitata
Plants described in 1883
Endemic flora of Madagascar
Taxa named by John Gilbert Baker